Nicolas Altstaedt (born 1982) is a German classical cellist.

Biography and career 
Altstaedt was born in Heidelberg, Germany. As a soloist, conductor, and artistic director, he performs repertoire spanning from early music to the contemporary.

Awarded the Credit Suisse Young Artist Award in 2010 he performed the Schumann concerto in a debut with the Vienna Philharmonic under Gustavo Dudamel at the Lucerne Festival.
Since then he has performed worldwide with orchestras such as the Tonhalle Orchestra, Czech Philharmonic, Tchaikovsky Symphony Orchestra, Tokyo Metropolitan Symphony Orchestra, all BBC Symphony Orchestras, Melbourne-and New Zealand Symphony Orchestra, Finnish Radio Symphony Orchestra working with conductors Sir Roger Norrington, Esa-Pekka Salonen, Sir Neville Marriner, Christoph Eschenbach, Krzysztof Urbański, Lahav Shani, Vladimir Ashkenazy, Robin Ticciati, Juraj Valcuha, Thomas Dausgaard, Sir Andrew Davis, Andrew Manze, Vladimir Fedosseyev, Andrey Boreyko, Fabien Gabel, Emmanuel Krivine, Dmitri Slobodeniouk, Thomas Hengelbrock, Leif Segerstam, Giovanni Antonini, René Jacobs and Andrea Marcon amongst many others.

Recent performances, include concerto debuts with Detroit Symphony and Helsinki Philharmonic and recital debuts at BOZAR Brussels, Carnegie Hall, Théâtre des Champs Elysées, Paris and Koerner Hall, Toronto and a tour through Australia. In 2018/19 he was the Artist in residence at the NDR Elbphilarmonie, where he performed with Krzysztof Urbański, Hannu Lintu, and Christoph Eschenbach on tour. Other upcoming highlights include appearances with DSO Berlin, Orchestre National de France, Rotterdam Philharmonic, BBC Symphony, Finnish Radio Symphony Orchestra, Yomiuri Symphony at Suntory Hall, Il Giardino Armonico and a tour of major European venues with the SWR Orchestra and Teodor Currentzis. As a conductor, he will appear with the SWR Stuttgart, Orchestre Philharmonique de Radio France, the Zurich and Scottish Chamber Orchestra, and l’Orchestre de Chambre de Lausanne. During the 17/18 season, Altstaedt gave the highly acclaimed Finnish Premiere of Esa-Pekka Salonen’s Cello Concerto under the baton of the composer at the Helsinki Festival and was also the Artist in Spotlight at the Concertgebouw, Amsterdam.

As a chamber musician Altstaedt regularly plays with  Ilya Gringolts, Vilde Frang, Pekka Kuusisto, Alexander Lonquich, Antoine Tamestit, Lawrence Power, Jonathan Cohen, Barnabas Kelemen and the Quatuor Ébène, performing regularly at Salzburg Festival, Verbier, Utrecht, Stavanger, Prague Spring Festival, Proms, Gstaad, Musikfest Bremen, Rheingau and Schleswig-Holstein.

In 2012 Altstaedt was chosen by Gidon Kremer to become his successor as the new artistic director of the Lockenhaus Chamber Music Festival, and in 2014 Adam Fischer asked him to follow in his footsteps as Artistic Director of the Haydn Philharmonie, with whom he regularly performs at Vienna Konzerthaus, Esterhazy Festival and will tour both China and Japan in the next season. Altstaedt will be Artistic Director of the Pfingstfestspiele Ittingen 2019 and 2020.

Altstaedt premieres new music and performs with composers like Wolfgang Rihm, Thomas Ades, Jörg Widmann, Matthias Pintscher, Fazıl Say, Bryce Dessner and Sofia Gubaidulina.

Altstaedt's recording of CPE Bach Concertos on Hyperion with Arcangelo and Jonathan Cohen received the BBC Music Magazine Concerto Award 2017.  His latest recording – Four Cities – a recital program of works by Say, Debussy, Shostakovich and Janacek with Fazıl Say was released on Warner Classics received the Edison Klassiek 2017. Altstaedt received the Musikpreis der Stadt Duisburg 2018. 
He was a BBC New Generation Artist 2010-2012 and a recipient of the "Borletti Buitoni Trust Fellowship" in 2009.
Altstaedt plays a cello by G.B. Guadagnini of 1749.

In 2022 Altstaedt was - with Friends - the lead star at the famous Prinsengrachtconcert in Amsterdam.

Selected discography
 Carl Philipp Emanuel Bach: Cello Concertos with Arcangelo & Jonathan Cohen (conductor) (Hyperion Records,  CDA68112, 2016)
 4 Cities: Recital CD with Fazıl Say (Warner Classics)

References

External links
 Nicolas Altstaedt's web site
 Nicolas Altstaedt's biography and discography on the Naxos web site
 Nicolas Altstaedt's biography on the BBC Music web site
 Nicolas Altstaedt as Artist in Residence at Hamburg Elbphilharmonie
 Warner Classics Recital CD
 Edison Klassiek 2017 for Fazıl Say and Nicolas Altstaedt
 Musikpreis der Stadt Duisburg for Nicolas Altstaedt

German classical cellists
Living people
1982 births
BBC Radio 3 New Generation Artists